Gitche Manitou (Gitchi Manitou, Kitchi Manitou, etc.) means "Great Spirit" in several Algonquian languages. Christian missionaries have translated God as Gitche Manitou in scriptures and prayers in the Algonquian languages.

Manitou is a common Algonquian term for spirit, mystery, or deity. Native American Churches in Mexico, United States and Canada often use this term.

Anishinaabe

In more recent Anishinaabe culture, the Anishinaabe language word Gichi-manidoo means Great Spirit, the Creator of all things and the Giver of Life, and is sometimes translated as the "Great Mystery". Historically, Anishinaabe people believed in a variety of spirits, whose images were placed near doorways for protection.

According to Anishinaabeg tradition, Michilimackinac, later named by European settlers as Mackinac Island, in Michigan, was the home of Gitche Manitou, and some Anishinaabeg tribes would make pilgrimages there for rituals devoted to the spirit.<ref>[https://books.google.com/books?id=zTL_AQAAQBAJ&pg=PA349 "The Americas: International Dictionary of Historic Places; editors:Trudy Ring, Noelle Watson and Paul Schellinger. Routledge, Taylor & Francis; 1996; pg. 349.]</ref>
 
In Henry Wadsworth Longfellow's The Song of Hiawatha, Gitche Manitou is spelled Gitche Manito.

Other Anishinaabe names for God incorporated through the process of syncretism are Gizhe-manidoo ("venerable Manidoo"), Wenizhishid-manidoo ("Fair Manidoo") and Gichi-ojichaag ("Great Spirit").  While Gichi-manidoo and Gichi-ojichaag both mean "Great Spirit", Gichi-manidoo carried the idea of the greater spiritual connectivity while Gichi-ojichaag carried the idea of individual soul's connection to the Gichi-manidoo.  Consequently, Christian missionaries often used the term Gichi-ojichaag to refer to the Christian idea of a Holy Spirit.

Other tribes
In addition to the Algonquian Anishinaabeg, many other tribes believed in Gitche Manitou.  References to the Great Manitou by the Cheyenne and the Oglala Sioux (notably in the recollections of Black Elk), indicate that belief in this deity extended into the Great Plains, fully across the wider group of Algonquian peoples.

Cognate terms recorded in other Algonquian languages include:
 Manitou

Sauk Fox: Mannittoo, God
Narragensett: Manitoo, God

 Gitche Manitou
Ojibwe: Gichi-manidooOttawa: Gchi-mnidooSwampy Cree: Kihci-manitôMiami: Kihci ManetoowaLenape:
Minsi: Kitschimanitto
Unami: Ketanëtuwit (<ket- 'great'+(m)anətu 'spirit'+-wi-t 'the one who is'; the initial m- in manətu is elided in this compound)
Nanticoke (spoken in Maryland): Gichtschi Manitto

 Kishe Manitou
Ojibwe: Gizhe-manidooOttawa: Gzhe-mnidooSwampy Cree: Kise-manitôNaskapi: Chisa-manituIllinois: Kisseh Manetou

 Other
Shawnee: WishemenetouGitche Manitou has been seen as those cultures' analogue to the Christian God. When early Christian (especially French Catholic) missionaries preached the Gospel to the Algonquian peoples, they adopted Gitche Manitou as a name for God in the Algonquian languages. This can be seen, for example, in the English translation of the "Huron Carol".

Related spirits
Spirits who were either aspects of Gitche Manitou or lesser spirits under Gitche Manitou include:
Hobomok, who was deemed more approachable than Gitche Manitou, and more likely to listen to pleas, but who was also mischievous and interpreted by Englishmen as being the devil, or an evil deity.

Manitou as mystical term

Manitou is the spiritual and fundamental life force among Algonquian groups in the Native American mythology. Manitou is one aspect of the interconnection and balance of nature and life, similar to the East Asian concept of qi. In simpler terms it can refer to a spirit. This spirit is seen as a person as well as a concept.  Everything has its own manitou—every plant, every stone and, since their invention, even machines. These manitous do not exist in a hierarchy like European gods/goddesses, but are more akin to one part of the body interacting with another and the spirit of everything; the collective is named Gitche Manitou.

See also
Ahone
Manitoba
Manitoulin Island
Names of God
Supreme Being
Wakan Tanka

Notes

References
 Densmore, Frances. Chippewa Customs. (1979, Minnesota Historical Press).
 Hoffman, Walter James, M.D.  The Mide'wiwin: Grand Medicine Society of the Ojibway.  (2005,  Lightning Source Inc.)
 Johnston, Basil. Ojibway Ceremonies. (1990, University of Nebraska Press).
 Johnston, Basil. The Manitous: the spiritual world of the Ojibway. (2001, Minnesota Historical Society Press).
 Nichols, John D. and Earl Nyholm. A Concise Dictionary of Minnesota Ojibwe. (1995, University of Minnesota Press).
 Cuoq, Jean André. Lexique de la Langue Algonquine. (1886, J. Chapleau & Fils).
 Rhodes, Richard A. Eastern Ojibwa-Chippewa-Ottawa Dictionary''. (1985, Mouton de Gruyter).

External links
 Mackinac Island
 Wisconsin History 
 Sault Tribe of Chippewa Indians

Anishinaabe mythology
Gods of the indigenous peoples of North America
Creator gods
Names of God
Nature gods